The 2022 NXT: The Great American Bash was the 10th Great American Bash professional wrestling event produced by WWE, and 24th Great American Bash event overall. It was held exclusively for wrestlers from the promotion's NXT brand division. The event aired as a special episode of WWE's weekly television series NXT 2.0, broadcast on the USA Network. It took place on July 5, 2022, at the WWE Performance Center in Orlando, Florida. This was the third Great American Bash to air as an annual television special of NXT.

Six matches were contested at the event. In the main event, Bron Breakker defeated Cameron Grimes to retain the NXT Championship.

Production

Background
The Great American Bash is a professional wrestling event established in 1985. Following WWE's acquisition of World Championship Wrestling (WCW) in March 2001, the promotion revived the event as their own annual pay-per-view (PPV) in 2004. The event continued until 2009. Following this 2009 event, The Great American Bash was discontinued as a PPV. In 2012, WWE revived the event to be held as a special episode of SmackDown but was again discontinued. In 2020, WWE again revived the event, this time for the developmental brand NXT as an annual television special of the NXT program. On June 4, 2022, during In Your House, WWE announced that the 10th Great American Bash under the WWE banner, and 24th overall, would be held on July 5 at the WWE Performance Center in Orlando, Florida. The special episode of NXT 2.0 aired on the USA Network.

Storylines 
The card included matches that resulted from scripted storylines, where wrestlers portrayed heroes, villains, or less distinguishable characters in scripted events that built tension and culminated in a wrestling match or series of matches. Results were predetermined by WWE's writers on the NXT brand, while storylines were played out on NXT's weekly television program NXT 2.0 and the supplementary online streaming show Level Up.

On the June 14 episode of NXT, after Bron Breakker successfully retained the NXT Championship, Cameron Grimes interrupted. Grimes called Breakker's success a joke and stated that Breakker only got successful because of his last name (Steiner). Grimes also stated that Breakker gets better every time he stepped in the ring, but didn't have Grimes' heart. Grimes then challenged Breakker for the title at The Great American Bash, and Breakker accepted.

Results

References

External links 
 

The Great American Bash
2022 in professional wrestling in Florida
2022 in professional wrestling
Events in Orlando, Florida
July 2022 events in the United States
Professional wrestling in Orlando, Florida
WWE NXT